In relational database theory, an equality-generating dependency (EGD) is a certain kind of constraint on data. It is a subclass of the class of embedded dependencies (ED).

An algorithm known as the chase takes as input an instance that may or may not satisfy a set of EGDs (or, more generally, a set of EDs), and, if it terminates (which is a priori undecidable), output an instance that does satisfy the EGDs.

An important subclass of equality-generating dependencies are functional dependencies.

Definition 
An equality-generating dependency is a sentence in first-order logic of the form:

A relational atom has the form  and an equality atom has the form , where each of the terms  are variables or constants.

An equivalent definition is the following:

where .
Indeed, generating a conjunction of equalities is equivalent to have multiple dependencies which generate only one equality.

References

Further reading 
 Serge Abiteboul, Richard B. Hull, Victor Vianu: Foundations of Databases. Addison-Wesley, 1995.
 Alin Deutsch, FOL Modeling of Integrity Constraints, https://web.archive.org/web/20140912044956/http://db.ucsd.edu/pubsFileFolder/305.pdf

Database theory
Logic